In phonetics, a trill is a consonantal sound produced by vibrations between the active articulator and passive articulator.

A trill is made by the articulator being held in place and the airstream causing it to vibrate. Usually a trill vibrates for 2–3 contacts, but may be up to 5, or even more if geminate. However, trills may also be produced with only one contact. While single-contact trills are similar to taps and flaps, a tap or flap differs from a trill in that it is made by a muscular contraction rather than airstream.

Phonemic trills 
Trill consonants included in the International Phonetic Alphabet:
  – Voiced alveolar trill
  – Voiceless alveolar trill
  – Voiced bilabial trill
  – Voiceless bilabial trill 
  – Voiced retroflex trill 
  – Voiced uvular trill
  – Voiceless uvular trill
  – voiced epiglottal trill
  – voiceless epiglottal trill

In addition,
  – velopharyngeal fricative found in disordered speech sometimes involves trilling of the velopharyngeal port, producing a 'snort'.

The bilabial trill is uncommon. The coronal trill is most frequently alveolar , but dental and postalveolar articulations  and  also occur. An alleged retroflex trill found in Toda has been transcribed  (that is, the same as the retroflex flap), but might be less ambiguously written , as only the onset is retroflex, with the actual trill being alveolar. The epiglottal trills are identified by the IPA as fricatives, with the trilling assumed to be allophonic. However, analyzing the sounds as trills may be more economical. There are also so-called strident vowels which are accompanied by epiglottal trill.

The cells in the IPA chart for the velar, (upper) pharyngeal, and glottal places of articulation are shaded as impossible. The glottis quite readily vibrates, but this occurs as the phonation of vowels and consonants, not as a consonant of its own. Dorso-palatal and velar vibratory motions of the tongue are occasionally produced, especially during the release of dorsal stops, and ingressive velar trills occur in snoring, but not in normal speech. The upper pharyngeal tract cannot reliably produce a trill, but the epiglottis does, and epiglottal trills are pharyngeal in the broad sense. It is in free variation with partially devoiced uvular fricative trill .

Voiceless trills occur phonemically in e.g. Welsh and Icelandic. (See also voiceless alveolar trill, voiceless retroflex trill, voiceless uvular trill.) Mangbetu and Ninde have phonemically voiceless bilabial trills.

The Czech language has two contrastive alveolar trills, one a fricative trill (written ř in the orthography). A symbol for this sound, has been dropped from the IPA, and it is now generally transcribed as a raised r, .

Liangshan Yi ("Cool Mountain" Yi) has two "buzzed" or fricative vowels  (written ṳ, i̤) which may also be trilled, .

The Chapakuran language Wariʼ and the Muran language Pirahã have a very unusual trilled phoneme, a voiceless bilabially post-trilled dental stop, .

A nasal trill  has been described from some dialects of Romanian, and is posited as an intermediate historical step in rhotacism. However, the phonetic variation of the sound is considerable, and it is not clear how frequently it is actually trilled.

Extralinguistic trills 
A linguolabial trill  is not known to be used phonemically but occurs when blowing a raspberry.

Snoring typically consists of vibration of the uvula and the soft palate (velum), which may be described as an ingressive velic trill. Like the uvular trill, the ingressive velic trill does not involve the tongue; it is the velum that passively vibrates in the airstream. The Speculative Grammarian has proposed a jocular symbol for the sound (and also the sound used to imitate a pig's snort), a wide O with a double dot (Ꙫ), suggesting a pig's snout.

There is no symbol for them in the IPA. Lateral coronal trills are sometimes used to imitate bird calls, and are a component of Donald Duck talk. A labiodental trill, is most likely to be lateral, but laterality is not distinctive among labial sounds.

Ejective trills are not known from any language although they are easy to produce. They may occur as mimesis of a cat's purr.

Summary

See also 
 List of phonetics topics
 Bronx cheer (gesture)

References

Bibliography 

 
 
 
 
 
 

Manner of articulation